is a city located in far western Shizuoka Prefecture, Japan. ,  the city had an estimated population of  57,885 in 24,232 households, and a population density of  668.7 persons per km².

Geography
Kosai is located in the far southwest corner of Shizuoka Prefecture, bordered by Aichi Prefecture to the west, Lake Hamana to the east. The name of the city means "west of the lake", in reference to its location near Lake Hamana. The city is bordered to the south by the Enshū Gulf of Pacific Ocean. Due to its location, the warm Kuroshio Current offshore provides for a temperate maritime climate with hot, humid summers and mild, cool winters.

Neighboring municipalities
Shizuoka Prefecture
Hamamatsu
Aichi Prefecture
Toyohashi

Demographics
Per Japanese census data, the population of Kosau has been relatively steady over the past 30 years.

Climate
The city has a climate characterized by characterized by hot and humid summers, and relatively mild winters (Köppen climate classification Cfa).  The average annual temperature in Kosai is 16.0 °C. The average annual rainfall is 1942 mm with September as the wettest month. The temperatures are highest on average in August, at around 27.3 °C, and lowest in January, at around 5.5 °C.

History
The area around Kosai has been noted for the production of Japanese pottery and porcelain since the Kofun period. During the Edo period, Kosai was tenryō territory administered directly by the Tokugawa shogunate, and the location of a barrier gate regulating traffic on the old Tōkaidō highway connecting Edo with Kyoto. A post station named Shirasuka-juku developed near the barrier, and this was the forerunner of modern Kosai.  During the establishment of the modern municipalities system of the early Meiji period in 1889, the area was reorganized into five villages within Hamana District, Shizuoka. Four of these villages (Washizu, Iride, Shirasuka, Chibata)  merged to form the city of Kosai on January 1, 1972.

On March 23, 2010, the town of Arai (from Hamana District) was merged into Kosai. Hamana District was dissolved as a result of this merger.

Government
Kosai has a mayor-council form of government with a directly elected mayor and a unicameral city legislature of 18 members. The city contributes one member to the Shizuoka Prefectural Assembly.

Economy
The economy of Kosai is dominated by light manufacturing of automobile components and electronics, as well as commercial fishing. Kosai is home to Suzuki Motor Corporation's Kosai Assembly Plant, Suzuki's main domestic production plant as well as to plants owned by Panasonic and Sony. Commercial fishing and aquaculture on Lake Hamana is also a component of the city's economy.

Education
Kosai has six public elementary schools and five public middle schools operated by the city government. The city has two public high schools operated by the Shizuoka Prefectural Board of Education. The prefecture also operates a special education school for the handicapped.

The ENE - Escola Nova Era, a Brazilian international school is also located in Kosai. During 1971-1992 a Swedish school was located in Chibata.

Transportation

Railway
 Central Japan Railway Company - Tōkaidō Main Line
 -  - 
Tenryū Hamanako Railroad Tenryū Hamanako Line
 -  -  -

Highway

Sister city relations
 Geraldton, Western Australia, Australia, since September 1998 with former Arai town

Local attractions
Arai Barrier Museum
Ōchiwatoge temple ruins, a National Historic Site
Toyoda Sakichi Memorial Museum
Honko-ji temple

Notable people from Kosai
Sakichi Toyoda, founder of Toyota
Yasuji Miyazaki, Olympic gold-medalist swimmer
Shozo Makino, Olympic silver-medalist swimmer

References

External links

 

 
Cities in Shizuoka Prefecture
Populated coastal places in Japan